Melolobium subspicatum is a species of flowering plant in the family Fabaceae. It is found only in South Africa. Its natural habitat is subtropical or tropical dry lowland grassland, and it is threatened by habitat loss.

References

Genisteae
Flora of South Africa
Endangered plants
Taxonomy articles created by Polbot